Hode is an unincorporated community in Martin County, Kentucky, United States.

A post office was established in the community in 1921, and named for Hodeviah Hensley, the son of a local minister.

References

Unincorporated communities in Martin County, Kentucky
Unincorporated communities in Kentucky